Lentzea californiensis is a bacterium from the genus Lentzea which has been isolated from soil in California.

References

Pseudonocardiales
Bacteria described in 2001